Simon James Cross (born 31 May 1965 in Hereford, England) is a former motorcycle speedway rider who spent most of his career with the Cradley Heathens.

Career
Simon Cross and Kelvin Tatum finished runner-up in Speedway World Pairs Championship in 1988 and he finished runner-up in the British Championship in 1990. He won the National League Pairs Championship in 1983 with Martin Yeates.

In early 1987, Cross was part of a touring troupe to Australia which included (among others) World Champion Hans Nielsen, Tommy Knudsen, Shawn Moran and Rick Miller. While in Australia he won the 1986/87 Western Australian State Championship at the Claremont Speedway in Perth.

1987 also saw Cross qualify for his first and only World Final, run over two days at the Olympic Stadium in Amsterdam. He finished in 10th place with 10 points scored (7 on day one, 3 on day two).

1989 World Team Cup Final
Simon also represented Great Britain when they won the 1989 Speedway World Team Cup Final at the Odsal Stadium in Bradford. Cross was involved in the infamous terrible crash on turn 1 of the first heat of the meeting which not only took all four riders out of the meeting, but ended the career of his Cradley teammate and three time World Champion Erik Gundersen. 
The Dane led out of the gate, but as Gundersen broadsided into the first turn Jimmy Nilsen and Lance King were battling one another for position and Gundersen was clipped from behind by them causing him to highside and all four riders (Gundersen, Cross, Jimmy Nilsen (Sweden) and Lance King (USA)) to crash, Nilsen and King were thrown towards the outside of the track and Cross, in attempting to negotiate through the melee hit Gundersen and was himself struck in the face by a wayward bike. 
Gundersen suffered head and spinal injuries suffered in being thrown over the highside and struck by the others when medics reached the Dane he was not breathing and his airway was blocked. Gundersen spent an extensive period in intensive care and at one point was not expected to survive eventually learning to walk again but suffering side effects of the crash his career was over. 
None of the riders took any further part in the meeting with King having a neck injury, Nilsen hip and thigh injuries and Cross a badly cut face.
All 4 were taken to Hospital and upon arrival there Cross saw his good friend Gundersen being treated by medics which would have been very hard to see.
Great Britain took the gold medal that day and were World Champions but it was, in all truth, inconsequential on a black day for Speedway.

World Final Appearances

Individual World Championship
 1987 -  Amsterdam, Olympic Stadium - 10th - 10pts
 1988 -  Vojens, Speedway Center - Reserve - Did Not Ride

World Pairs Championship
 1988 -  Bradford, Odsal Stadium (with Kelvin Tatum) - 2nd - 41pts (20)
 1990 -  Landshut, Ellermühle Stadium (with Kelvin Tatum) - 8th - 20pts (0)

World Team Cup
 1987 -  Fredericia, Fredericia Speedway,  Coventry, Brandon Stadium and  Prague, Marketa Stadium (with Kelvin Tatum / Simon Wigg / Jeremy Doncaster / Marvyn Cox)  - 2nd - 101pts (21)
 1988 -  Long Beach, Veterans Memorial Stadium (with Simon Wigg / Kelvin Tatum / Chris Morton / Gary Havelock) - 4th - 22pts (3)
 1989 -  Bradford, Odsal Stadium (with Jeremy Doncaster / Kelvin Tatum / Paul Thorp / Simon Wigg) - Winner - 48pts (0)

World Longtrack Championship

Finalist

 1987  Mühldorf 2pts (19th as Reserve)
 1988  Scheeßel 3pts (16th)
 1995  Scheeßel 11pts (9th)

Grand-Prix Overall

 1998 8th (45pts)

European Grasstrack Championship

Finalist

 1985  La Reole 5pts (14th)
 1986  Eenrum 24pts (CHAMPION)

References

External links
 http://grasstrackgb.co.uk/simon-cross/

1965 births
Living people
British speedway riders
English motorcycle racers
Cradley Heathens riders
Oxford Cheetahs riders
Coventry Bees riders
Middlesbrough Bears riders
Weymouth Wildcats riders
Individual Speedway Long Track World Championship riders